This is a list of singles which have reached number one on the Irish Singles Chart in 1984.

19 Number Ones
Most weeks at No.1 (song): "Two Tribes" - Frankie Goes To Hollywood (7)
Most weeks at No.1 (artist): Frankie Goes To Hollywood (7)
Most No.1s: Wham! (2)

See also
1984 in music
Irish Singles Chart
List of artists who reached number one in Ireland

1984 in Irish music
1984 record charts
1984